Stipe Šuvar (17 February 1936 – 29 June 2004) was a Croatian politician and sociologist who was regarded to have been one of the most influential communist politicians in the League of Communists of Croatia in Socialist Republic of Croatia during Yugoslavia and later in modern Croatia.

He entered top politics in 1972 being co-opted to the Central Committee (CC) of the League of Communists of Croatia (LCC). Two years later he became Croatian minister of education and performed a controversial educational reform in Croatia. In 1980s he was a member of the Presidency of the LCC's CC, then a member and President of the Presidency of the Central Committee of the League of Communists of Yugoslavia (LCY). In 1989 Croatian Parliament elected Šuvar a member of the Presidency of Yugoslavia but dismissed him one year later when, after the first multi-party elections in Croatia, it was already dominated by the Croatian Democratic Union (HDZ) of Franjo Tuđman.

After the collapse of communism and the end of Socialist Yugoslavia, Šuvar founded the magazine Hrvatska ljevica and the Socialist Labour Party (SRP). Šuvar was known as a lifelong Marxist ideologist and opponent of nationalism. Unlike many other Yugoslav communist officials, he remained a proponent of socialism after the breakup of Yugoslavia.

Academic work and early political career

Šuvar was born in 1936 in the Dalmatian village of Zagvozd. At the age of 19, he joined the League of Communists of Yugoslavia. He studied at the Law Faculty in Zagreb, where he received a sociology doctorate in 1965. From 1960 through till the 1980s he taught sociology at the University of Zagreb and at other universities in Yugoslavia and published a number of books on both sociological and political topics.

From 1963 to 1972 he was a chief editor of the Zagreb monthly Naše teme. In 1969, Šuvar in a polemic with Matica hrvatska official Šime Đodan denied the claims by Maspok ideologists that Croatia was being exploited by other Yugoslav republics. During time Šuvar was also active in several other periodicals, lastly in LCY-run "Socijalizam" (Socialism) in the 1980s.

In 1972, after the Maspok had been defeated and the leadership led by Mika Tripalo purged from the top of the LCC, Šuvar was co-opted to the CC LCC. Two years later he became Croatian secretary (minister) for culture and education and stayed at that position until 1982.

The "White Book" 
From 1982 to 1986, Šuvar was a member of the Presidium of the League of Communists of Croatia. From 1983 onwards, he was responsible for the ideological section of the League and, holding this office, in 1984, he organized a discussion about the ideological struggle on the cultural front. Participants of the meeting were handed materials containing quotations from texts of 186 (mostly Serbian and Slovene) authors which had been published in the Yugoslav media between 1982 and 1984. These texts were labeled as unacceptable, anti-socialist and more or less openly nationalist. The document, nicknamed then the "White Book" (B(ij)ela knjiga) and "Flower of Evil" (Cv(ij)eće zla), was condemned especially by the Serbian intelligentsia as a Stalinist attack on freedom of thought.

Member and chairman of the CC LCY Presidium

In 1986, Šuvar was elected to the LCY Presidium as a representative of the Croatian Party branch along with Ivica Račan. In June 1988, when the Presidium was about to choose a new chairman between Šuvar and Račan, Šuvar won out. At the vote he was backed up, among others, by the Serb members of the Presidium including Slobodan Milošević. However, only one month later controversies between Šuvar and Milošević emerged because of Šuvar's opposition to the anti-bureaucratic revolution organized by the Serbian leader. In October 1988, when a dispute between Šuvar and Milošević at one Presidium session went public, a campaign for Šuvar's dismissal took place in Serbia.

In the first days of October 1988, rallies in Novi Sad supported by Milošević forced out the Vojvodinian leadership, while Montenegrin establishment, with the support of the LCY Presidium and of the federal Presidency, resisted rallies in Titograd. On 17 October, in the heated political atmosphere, the LCY Central Committee met up at its 17th plenary session in Belgrade to discuss general political situation in Yugoslavia. Yugoslav media expected the session to be crucial for country’s future and also more than 200 foreign journalists were about to attend the plenum. In his address to the plenum, Šuvar called for economic and political reforms within the frameworks of socialism and for combating nationalism in the entire country. He expressed the conviction that nationalism wouldn’t succeed neither in destroying Yugoslavia nor in turning it into a centralized country. Most of the Yugoslav communist officials’ addresses were in mutual accordance about the need of reforms and of unity and the plenum was therefore seen as successful by most Yugoslav media. However, mutual attacks of the republics’ leaders started again after the session and the political situation kept getting worse.

In January 1989, after the Montenegrin leadership was brought down during new rallies in Titograd and a few days before the 20th session of the LCY Central Committee was to take place, a conference of the Vojvodinian communists attacked Šuvar and asked the LCY Presidium to dismiss him, what was supported by the Serb leadership and followed by a new inflammatory campaign in Serbian media and Party organizations against Šuvar. The Yugoslav Federal Presidency, afraid of the overthrow of the LCY leadership in the same way as it had happened with local party leaderships in Vojvodina and Montenegro, put the country's police forces on a state of alert and warned the Serbian leadership of a state of emergency being possibly declared if more demonstrations took place in Belgrade during the session. The session itself went in a normal way but didn't bring any positive results. Before the session Šuvar had promised that he would call the things their right names meaning, supposedly, directly condemn Milošević's policy, but at the end he withdrew a sharper version of his report and presented a less explicit one. The proposal to dismiss Šuvar from the position of LCY leader was rejected by the party Presidium in March 1989. Out of the 20 Presidium members, in favour of the dismissal were only six, including Milošević and other Serbian representatives.

At the same time, Šuvar was continuously opposing separatist tendencies in his own Croatia and in Slovenia. He frequently warned against the rise of Croat nationalism which, in his view, was at that time most visible in discussions about language policy. Šuvar also opposed demands of Slovenes for a broader autonomy of their republic and criticized public attacks on the Yugoslav People's Army in Slovene media. In June 1988 at LCY Presidium session discussing the case of Janez Janša, Šuvar said: 
"Socialist forces in Slovenia are in defense in the face of a mass movement. This movement in Slovenia includes not only elitist petty-bourgeois circles but also the youth. They regard the Army an occupier and Yugoslavia a burden and an exploiter. A phobia of the people from the country's South prevails there. Petty-bourgeois arrogance has assumed a racist dimension."
According to Šuvar himself, in June 1988 the three Slovenian members of the Presidium voted for Račan to become Presidium chairman.

In February 1989, Šuvar negotiated with the miners in the 1989 Kosovo miners' strike as a representative of the League of Communists of Yugoslavia.

Member of the Presidency of Yugoslavia

In Spring 1989, the Croatian Parliament elected Šuvar the Croat representative to the Presidency of the Federation, the collective head of state of Yugoslavia. The new Presidency was constituted in the Yugoslav Assembly on May 15 and two days later Šuvar resigned from the party Presidium as well as from the Central Committee. In April 1990 multi-party parliamentary elections took place in Croatia, in which Franjo Tuđman's HDZ won with an independence programme. Tuđman asked Šuvar to resign but he refused; on the 24th August 1990 Croatian Parliament dismissed Šuvar from the Yugoslav Presidency, choosing Stipe Mesić of HDZ in his place. On that occasion in the Parliament, Šuvar held his last speech while holding a political office. He warned against hostilities and possible ethnic conflicts in Yugoslavia and in Croatia, called for a new agreement on Yugoslavia or for its peaceful dissolution and for respecting rights of Serbs within Croatia. He expressed the hope for a new rise of the left in its struggle for socialism and ironically congratulated HDZ for completing the Serb-driven anti-bureaucratic revolution by eliminating him from politics. The speech was twice interrupted by an uproar of the HDZ deputies and followed by sharply critical replies of several of them while nobody of Šuvar’s own LCC spoke up.

Late years
On 1 November 1990, he left the League of Communists of Croatia (SDP-SKH) just 2 days before the party convention on which they would be reformed to a social democratic party. He stated his reasons in a letter saying that SDP-SKH was no longer a left-wing or a revolutionary party but an ordinary civil party just like the rest of the political spectrum. After he had left the political scene, Šuvar returned to Zagreb University as a professor of sociology. In 1994 he founded the magazine Hrvatska ljevica (The Croatian Left) and in 1997, he returned to politics by creating the Socialist Labour Party of Croatia. Šuvar succeeded in bringing some respectable personalities around the party, but the party itself never got more than 1% of the votes in Croatian parliamentary elections. He was its chairman until 2004, when, shortly before his death, he resigned. Šuvar was vocally critical of nationalist policies of the regime of Franjo Tuđman which targeted Serbs of Croatia, especially after the 1995 Operation Storm.

After 1990, Šuvar continued publishing, for example Hrvatski karusel ("The Croatian merry-go-round") in 2003. He gave a number of interviews to the media, in which he reflected on both his role in politics of former Yugoslavia and events after the country's break-up. Šuvar, unlike many of his former communist fellows, didn't abandon socialist ideals and stayed staunchly critical towards all kinds of nationalism, including the one of his own nation. At the same time he stated his regret on some of the more radical policies he supported during SFRY, and argued in favour of democratic socialism.

See also 
 League of Communists of Yugoslavia
 Novi Plamen
 Socialist Labour Party of Croatia

References 

|-

1936 births
2004 deaths
People from Zagvozd
Croatian sociologists
Croatian communists
Croatian socialists
League of Communists of Croatia politicians
Socialist Labour Party of Croatia politicians
Central Committee of the League of Communists of Yugoslavia members
Presidency of the Socialist Federal Republic of Yugoslavia members
Croatian Marxists